Chloé Robichaud (born January 31, 1988) is a Canadian director best known for her debut film Sarah Prefers to Run. The film premiered at the 2013 Cannes Film Festival in the Un Certain Regard section.

Early life and education
Robichaud was born in Cap-Rouge, Quebec. She graduated from the Mel Hoppenheim School of Cinema at Concordia University in 2010.

Career
Robichaud made her feature film debut with Sarah Prefers to Run. It was screened in the Un Certain Regard section at the 2013 Cannes Film Festival.

Robichaud launched the webseries Féminin/Féminin in 2014, about a group of six Montrealer lesbians dealing with love and growing up in the city. The series ran for an initial eight episodes. In 2018 Robichaud directed a second season made up of an additional eight episodes.

In 2015, Robichaud announced her next film would be Boundaries, which presents three women whose paths cross in the fictional country of Besco, a small, isolated island facing an important economic crisis.

She is an out lesbian. In February 2022, she announced her engagement to actress and comedian Katherine Levac.

Filmography
Regardless - 2008
Au revoir Timothy - 2009
Moi non plus - 2010
Nature morte - 2010
Herd Leader (Chef de meute) - 2012
Sarah Prefers to Run (Sarah préfère la course) - 2013
Féminin/Féminin - 2014
Boundaries (Pays) - 2016

See also 
 List of female film and television directors
 List of lesbian filmmakers
 List of LGBT-related films directed by women

References

External links 

1988 births
Living people
21st-century Canadian screenwriters
21st-century Canadian women writers
Canadian women film directors
Canadian women screenwriters
Canadian lesbian artists
Canadian lesbian writers
LGBT film directors
Canadian LGBT screenwriters
Film directors from Quebec
Writers from Quebec City
Concordia University alumni
21st-century Canadian LGBT people
Lesbian screenwriters